The following elections occurred in the year 1999.

 1999 electoral calendar

Africa
 1999 Algerian presidential election
 1999 Botswana general election
 1999 Beninese parliamentary election
 1999 Central African Republic presidential election
 1999 Djiboutian presidential election
 1999 Equatorial Guinean legislative election
 1999–2000 Guinea-Bissau general election
 1999 Malawian general election
 1999 Mozambican general election
 1999 Namibian general election
 1999 Nigerian parliamentary election
 1999 Nigerian presidential election
 1999 Nigerien parliamentary election
 1999 Nigerien presidential election
 1999 South African general election
 1999 Togolese parliamentary election

Asia
 1999 Indonesian legislative election
 1999 Israeli legislative election
 1999 Israeli prime ministerial election
 1999 Kuwaiti general election
 1999 Nepalese legislative election
 1999 Singaporean presidential election
 1999 Sri Lankan presidential election
 1999 Sri Lankan provincial council elections
 1999 Tajik presidential election
 1999 Malaysian general election
 1999 Wakayama gubernatorial election
 1999 Yemeni presidential election

India
 1999 Indian general election
 1999 Indian general election in Andhra Pradesh
 1999 Indian general election in Haryana
 1999 Indian general election in Delhi
 1999 Indian general election in Tamil Nadu
 1999 Maharashtra Legislative Assembly election

Kazakhstan
 1999 Kazakh legislative election
 1999 Kazakh presidential election
 1999 Kazakhstani legislative election

Turkey
 1999 Turkish general election
 1999 Turkish local elections

Europe
 1999 Abkhazian constitutional referendum
 1999 Abkhazian presidential election
 1999 Ålandic legislative election
 1999 Belgian federal election
 1999 Belgian regional elections
 1999 Estonian parliamentary election
 1999 European Parliament election
 1999 Finnish parliamentary election
 1999 German presidential election
 1999 Icelandic parliamentary election
 1999 Irish local elections
 1999 Jersey by-elections
 1999 Jersey general election
 1999 Luxembourg general election
 1999 Norwegian local elections
 1999 Portuguese legislative election
 1999 Slovak presidential election
 1999 Ukrainian presidential election
 1999 Moldovan local elections
 1999 Russian legislative election

Austria
 1999 Austrian legislative election
 1999 European Parliament election in Austria

European Parliament
 1999 European Parliament election in Austria
 1999 European Parliament election in Belgium
 1999 European Parliament election in Denmark
 1999 European Parliament election
 1999 European Parliament election in Aosta Valley
 1999 European Parliament election in Veneto
 1999 European Parliament election in Finland
 1999 European Parliament election in France
 1999 European Parliament election in Germany
 1999 European Parliament election in Greece
 1999 European Parliament election in Ireland
 1999 European Parliament election in Italy
 1999 European Parliament election in Luxembourg
 1999 European Parliament election in the Netherlands
 1999 European Parliament election in Portugal
 1999 European Parliament election in Spain
 1999 European Parliament election in Sweden
 1999 European Parliament election in the United Kingdom
 1999 European Parliament election in France

Germany
 1999 Brandenburg state election
 1999 Bremen state election
 1999 European Parliament election in Germany
 1999 Hesse state election
 1999 Saarland state election
 1999 Saxony state election

Italy
 1999 European Parliament election in Aosta Valley
 1999 European Parliament election in Italy
 1999 European Parliament election in Veneto
 1999 Sardinian regional election

Spain
 1999 Catalan regional election
 1999 Aragonese regional election
 1999 Valencian regional election
 1999 European Parliament election in Spain

Switzerland
 1999 Swiss Federal Council election
 1999 Swiss federal election

Turkey
 1999 Turkish general election
 1999 Turkish local elections

United Kingdom
 1999 Eddisbury by-election
 1999 European Parliament election in the United Kingdom
 1999 Hamilton South by-election
 1999 Kensington and Chelsea by-election
 1999 Leeds Central by-election
 1999 Liberal Democrats leadership election
 1999 United Kingdom local elections
 1999 Scottish local elections
 1999 National Assembly for Wales election
 1999 Scottish Parliament election
 1999 Wigan by-election

United Kingdom local
 1999 United Kingdom local elections
 1999 Scottish local elections

English local
 1999 Adur Council election
 1999 Allerdale Council election
 1999 Alnwick Council election
 1999 Amber Valley Council election
 1999 Arun Council election
 1999 Ashfield Council election
 1999 Ashford Council election
 1999 Aylesbury Vale Council election
 1999 Babergh Council election
 1999 Barrow-in-Furness Council election
 1999 Bolton Council election
 1999 Brentwood Council election
 1999 Bromsgrove Council election
 1999 Burnley Council election
 1999 Bury Council election
 1999 Calderdale Council election
 1999 Cheltenham Council election
 1999 Cherwell District Council election
 1999 Chorley Council election
 1999 Craven Council election
 1999 Dacorum Council election
 1999 Dartford Council election
 1999 Daventry Council election
 1999 Derby Council election
 1999 Eastleigh Council election
 1999 Ellesmere Port and Neston Council election
 1999 Epping Forest Council election
 1999 Fareham Council election
 1999 Fylde Council election
 1999 Gateshead Council election
 1999 Gosport Council election
 1999 Halton Council election
 1999 Harlow Council election
 1999 Hart Council election
 1999 Hartlepool Council election
 1999 Hastings Council election
 1999 Hinckley and Bosworth Council election
 1999 Hull Council election
 1999 Hyndburn Council election
 1999 Ipswich Borough Council election
 1999 Kettering Borough Council election
 1999 Knowsley Council election
 1999 Leeds City Council election
 1999 Lichfield Council election
 1999 City of Lincoln Council election
 1999 Liverpool Council election
 1999 Manchester Council election
 1999 Mid Sussex Council election
 1999 Mole Valley Council election
 1999 New Forest Council election
 1999 Newcastle-under-Lyme Council election
 1999 Northampton Council election
 1999 Oldham Council election
 1999 Oxford City Council election
 1999 Penwith Council election
 1999 Portsmouth Council election
 1999 Preston Council election
 1999 Purbeck Council election
 1999 Redditch Council election
 1999 Restormel Council election
 1999 Rochdale Council election
 1999 Rochford Council election
 1999 Rossendale Council election
 1999 Rugby Council election
 1999 Runnymede Council election
 1999 Rushmoor Council election
 1999 Ryedale Council election
 1999 Salford Council election
 1999 Scarborough Council election
 1999 Sedgefield Council election
 1999 Sedgemoor Council election
 1999 Sefton Council election
 1999 Solihull Council election
 1999 South Gloucestershire Council election
 1999 South Lakeland Council election
 1999 South Oxfordshire Council election
 1999 South Ribble Council election
 1999 South Tyneside Council election
 1999 Southampton Council election
 1999 Southend-on-Sea Council election
 1999 St Albans City and District Council election
 1999 St Helens Council election
 1999 Stevenage Council election
 1999 Stratford-on-Avon Council election
 1999 Swindon Council election
 1999 Tamworth Council election
 1999 Tandridge Council election
 1999 Three Rivers Council election
 1999 Thurrock Council election
 1999 Tonbridge and Malling Council election
 1999 Trafford Council election
 1999 Tunbridge Wells Council election
 1999 Tynedale Council election
 1999 Vale of White Horse Council election
 1999 Wakefield Council election
 1999 Watford Council election
 1999 Waveney Council election
 1999 Welwyn Hatfield Council election
 1999 West Devon Council election
 1999 West Lancashire Council election
 1999 West Lindsey Council election
 1999 West Wiltshire Council election
 1999 Weymouth and Portland Council election
 1999 Wigan Council election
 1999 Winchester Council election
 1999 Wirral Council election
 1999 Woking Council election
 1999 Wokingham Council election
 1999 Wolverhampton Council election
 1999 Worcester Council election
 1999 Worthing Council election
 1999 Wyre Forest Council election
 1999 City of York Council election

Scottish local
 1999 North Lanarkshire Council election
 1999 Highland Council election

North America
 1999–2000 Belizean municipal elections

Canada
 1999 Manitoba general election
 1999 New Brunswick general election
 1999 Newfoundland general election
 1999 Northwest Territories general election
 1999 Nova Scotia general election
 1999 Nunavut general election
 1999 Ontario general election
 1999 Prince Edward Island Liberal Party leadership election
 1999 Quebec municipal elections
 1999 Saskatchewan general election

Caribbean
 1999 Antigua and Barbuda general election
 1999 Barbadian general election
 1999 British Virgin Islands general election
 1999 Grenadian general election
 1999 Trinidadian local elections

United States
 1999 United States gubernatorial elections

United States mayoral
 1999 Baltimore mayoral election
 1999 Houston mayoral election
 1999 Philadelphia mayoral election
 1999 San Francisco mayoral election

United States gubernatorial
 1999 Louisiana gubernatorial election

Oceania
 1999 Cook Islands general election
 1999 Fijian general election
 1999 Tongan general election
 1999 Niuean general election

Australia
 1999 Burwood state by-election
 1999 Holt by-election
 1999 New South Wales state election
 1999 Australian republic referendum
 1999 Victorian state election

New Zealand
 1999 New Zealand general election
 1999 New Zealand justice referendum
 1999 New Zealand general election

South America
 1999 Argentine general election
 1999 Bolivian municipal elections
 1999–2000 Chilean presidential election
 1999 Uruguayan general election
 December 1999 Venezuelan constitutional referendum
 1999 Guatemalan general election
 1999 Panamanian general election
 1999 Salvadoran presidential election

See also

 
1999
Elections